Raja Uday Pratap Singh, Raja of Bhinga, C.S.I. (3 September 1850 – 1913) was a noted zamindar and philanthropist from Bhinga.

Family and education
He succeeded his father, the late Raja Krishna Datta Singh in 1862 and took charge of the estate of Bhinga in 1869. He was educated at the Court of Wards Institute, Lucknow.

Philanthropic activity
He founded Hewett Kshatriya High School in Varanasi in 1909 which has grown into Udai Pratap Autonomous College. He also founded Udai Pratap Public School at Varanasi. He also established an orphans' home - Bhinga Raj Anathalaya at Kamachchha in Varanasi and also created a permanent fund by donating it Rs. 1,23,000/- to meet the recurring expenses. He donated thousands and lacs of rupees to several social organizations, to name a few- King George Medical College, Lucknow; Moolghandh Kuti Vihar, Sarnath; Calvin Taluqedar College, Lucknow; Hindi Pracharini Sabha, etc. He also created several permanent funds for providing scholarships to students from the interest earned.

He was also founder of  the "Kshatriya Upkarni Mahasabha" for which he has made an endowment of Rs. 35,000;  and was instrumental in founding of Akhil Bharatiya Kshatriya Mahasabha. He along with Thakur Umarao Singhji of Kotla, Raja Balwant Singh of Awagarh was instrumental in founding of Akhil Bharatiya Kshatriya Mahasabha in year 1897 He was advisor to Education Commission. He was made member of Union Public Service Commission in the year 1886. In acknowledgement and recognition to his education, he was chosen fellow of Allahabad and Calcutta Universities.

In later years of his life, he stayed in Varanasi, where he met Ramakrishna Paramhansa and at his request a center was started for which the Raja provided the initial funds for a year.

Writings
He is the author of books - A history of the Bhinga Raj Family (1883); Democracy not suited to India (1888), The decay of the landed Aristocracy in India (1892); Memorandum on the education of the sons of Landlords (1882); Minute on the Law of Sedition in India (1892); The Russul Question (1893) and Views and Observations (1907).

References

1850 births
1913 deaths
Indian royalty
Founders of Indian schools and colleges
Companions of the Order of the Star of India
People from Shravasti district
English-language writers from India
19th-century Indian philanthropists